Nymphicula kinabaluensis is a moth in the family Crambidae. It was described by Wolfram Mey in 2009. It is found on Borneo.

References

Nymphicula
Moths described in 2009